Shine On is a nine-CD box set by English progressive rock band Pink Floyd, released in 1992 through EMI Records in the United Kingdom and Columbia Records in the United States, to coincide with Pink Floyd's 25th anniversary as a recording and touring band. All CDs were digitally remastered.

Content 
The eight albums included in this box set are:
A Saucerful of Secrets
Meddle
The Dark Side of the Moon
Wish You Were Here
Animals
The Wall
A Momentary Lapse of Reason
The Early Singles (bonus CD, unavailable elsewhere)

The packaging on each of the previously released albums was unique to this set, with each CD housed in a solid black jewel case with a small sticker of the album cover affixed to the front. When lined up in order of release, the spines of the eight CD cases displayed the prism image from the cover of The Dark Side of the Moon.

Included with the box set was a hardcover book chronicling the career of Pink Floyd, from its inception to the late 1980s, and an envelope of postcards depicting artwork from the included seven albums and the cover of the box set itself.

As the collection was meant to showcase the best of Pink Floyd, the decision was made to not include the soundtrack albums More or Obscured by Clouds, or the albums Ummagumma, Atom Heart Mother and The Final Cut. The band's first album, The Piper at the Gates of Dawn, was also omitted, as EMI were planning to release a special edition of the album at the time, and it was hoped that new fans would buy both this set and the re-released debut album.

David Gilmour said the title of the Shine On box set (taken from the Wish You Were Here track "Shine On You Crazy Diamond") was not meant to indicate retirement on the band's part but rather a continuation of the band's progress. According to drummer Nick Mason, an initial suggestion for the title of the set was The Big Bong Theory.

The Early Singles
Shine On contained a bonus CD which compiled, for the first time ever, the band's first five 7" single A- and B-sides, in their original mono mixes. Some promotional copies of the disc were also issued separately to radio stations. Unlike the other discs in the box set, The Early Singles was housed in a digipak case.

Track listing

Original release dates
Tracks 1 & 2: 11 March 1967
Tracks 3 & 4: 17 June 1967
Tracks 5 & 6: 18 November 1967
Tracks 7 & 8: 13 April 1968
Tracks 9 & 10: 17 December 1968

Personnel
Richard Wright – piano; organ; mellotron on 7, 8; vibraphone on 10; vocals on 6, 7; backing vocals on 1, 2, 3, 4, 5, 8, 9
Syd Barrett – guitar on 1 to 6; vocals on 1 to 5; backing vocals on 6
David Gilmour – guitar on 7 to 10; vocals on 8, 9, 10; backing vocals on 7
Roger Waters – bass guitar; vocals on 9, 10; backing vocals on 2, 3, 5, 6, 7, 8
Nick Mason – drums, percussion

Production
James Guthrie – remastering production
Alan Parsons – assistant remastering on the included release of The Dark Side of the Moon
Aubrey Powell – sleeve design
Doug Sax – remastering
Storm Thorgerson – sleeve design

References

Albums produced by David Gilmour
Albums produced by Joe Boyd
Albums produced by Nick Mason
Albums produced by Norman Smith (record producer)
Albums produced by Richard Wright (musician)
Albums produced by Roger Waters
Albums with cover art by Storm Thorgerson
Pink Floyd compilation albums
1992 compilation albums
Columbia Records compilation albums
EMI Records compilation albums
Albums recorded at A&M Studios
Albums recorded at Morgan Sound Studios
Albums recorded at CBS 30th Street Studio
Albums recorded at Studio Miraval